Samara constituency (No. 158) is a Russian legislative constituency in Samara Oblast. In its current configuration the constituency covers parts of Samara, Novokuybyshevsk and south-eastern Samara Oblast. Until 2007 the constituency was based entirely in metropolitan Samara.

Members 
By-election are shown in italics.

Election results

1993

|-
! colspan=2 style="background-color:#E9E9E9;text-align:left;vertical-align:top;" |Candidate
! style="background-color:#E9E9E9;text-align:left;vertical-align:top;" |Party
! style="background-color:#E9E9E9;text-align:right;" |Votes
! style="background-color:#E9E9E9;text-align:right;" |%
|-
|style="background-color:"|
|align=left|Lyubov Rozhkova
|align=left|Communist Party
|
|21.56%
|-
| colspan="5" style="background-color:#E9E9E9;"|
|- style="font-weight:bold"
| colspan="3" style="text-align:left;" | Total
| 
| 100%
|-
| colspan="5" style="background-color:#E9E9E9;"|
|- style="font-weight:bold"
| colspan="4" |Source:
|
|}

1995

|-
! colspan=2 style="background-color:#E9E9E9;text-align:left;vertical-align:top;" |Candidate
! style="background-color:#E9E9E9;text-align:left;vertical-align:top;" |Party
! style="background-color:#E9E9E9;text-align:right;" |Votes
! style="background-color:#E9E9E9;text-align:right;" |%
|-
|style="background-color:#23238E"|
|align=left|Vladimir Tarachyov
|align=left|Our Home – Russia
|
|12.73%
|-
|style="background-color:"|
|align=left|Lyubov Rozhkova (incumbent)
|align=left|Independent
|
|11.72%
|-
|style="background-color:#F21A29"|
|align=left|Yury Sakharnov
|align=left|Trade Unions and Industrialists – Union of Labour
|
|11.10%
|-
|style="background-color:"|
|align=left|Natalya Morozova
|align=left|Union of Communists
|
|9.74%
|-
|style="background-color:"|
|align=left|Vladimir Zakharchenko
|align=left|Independent
|
|8.76%
|-
|style="background-color:"|
|align=left|Vladimir Shorin
|align=left|Independent
|
|7.60%
|-
|style="background-color:#F5821F"|
|align=left|Valery Semyonychev
|align=left|Bloc of Independents
|
|4.16%
|-
|style="background-color:#3A46CE"|
|align=left|Mark Feygin
|align=left|Democratic Choice of Russia – United Democrats
|
|4.09%
|-
|style="background-color:"|
|align=left|Andrey Kireev
|align=left|Liberal Democratic Party
|
|3.89%
|-
|style="background-color:#1A1A1A"|
|align=left|Yevgeny Lartsev
|align=left|Stanislav Govorukhin Bloc
|
|3.40%
|-
|style="background-color:"|
|align=left|Yevgeny Kladishchev
|align=left|Independent
|
|2.85%
|-
|style="background-color:#DA2021"|
|align=left|Sergey Trakhirov
|align=left|Ivan Rybkin Bloc
|
|2.53%
|-
|style="background-color:#A8A821"|
|align=left|Aleksey Leushkin
|align=left|Stable Russia
|
|2.44%
|-
|style="background-color:#FE4801"|
|align=left|Oleg Tikhonov
|align=left|Pamfilova–Gurov–Lysenko
|
|2.23%
|-
|style="background-color:"|
|align=left|Vladislav Marshansky
|align=left|Independent
|
|0.68%
|-
|style="background-color:#000000"|
|colspan=2 |against all
|
|9.14%
|-
| colspan="5" style="background-color:#E9E9E9;"|
|- style="font-weight:bold"
| colspan="3" style="text-align:left;" | Total
| 
| 100%
|-
| colspan="5" style="background-color:#E9E9E9;"|
|- style="font-weight:bold"
| colspan="4" |Source:
|
|}

1999

|-
! colspan=2 style="background-color:#E9E9E9;text-align:left;vertical-align:top;" |Candidate
! style="background-color:#E9E9E9;text-align:left;vertical-align:top;" |Party
! style="background-color:#E9E9E9;text-align:right;" |Votes
! style="background-color:#E9E9E9;text-align:right;" |%
|-
|style="background-color:"|
|align=left|Aleksandr Belousov
|align=left|Independent
|
|34.89%
|-
|style="background-color:"|
|align=left|Nikolay Musatkin
|align=left|Communist Party
|
|20.90%
|-
|style="background-color:"|
|align=left|Vladimir Tarachyov (incumbent)
|align=left|Unity
|
|12.07%
|-
|style="background-color:"|
|align=left|Vyacheslav Sonin
|align=left|Independent
|
|9.25%
|-
|style="background-color:"|
|align=left|Nikolay Gavrilov
|align=left|Yabloko
|
|4.76%
|-
|style="background-color:"|
|align=left|Vladimir Zakharchenko
|align=left|Independent
|
|4.26%
|-
|style="background-color:#FF4400"|
|align=left|Leonid Tikhun
|align=left|Andrey Nikolayev and Svyatoslav Fyodorov Bloc
|
|1.49%
|-
|style="background-color:#C21022"|
|align=left|Aleksandr Shvarev
|align=left|Party of Pensioners
|
|1.14%
|-
|style="background-color:"|
|align=left|Yury Yudin
|align=left|Russian Ecological Party "Kedr"
|
|1.02%
|-
|style="background-color:#00542A"|
|align=left|Lyubov Rozhkova
|align=left|Russian Party
|
|0.99%
|-
|style="background-color:#000000"|
|colspan=2 |against all
|
|8.05%
|-
| colspan="5" style="background-color:#E9E9E9;"|
|- style="font-weight:bold"
| colspan="3" style="text-align:left;" | Total
| 
| 100%
|-
| colspan="5" style="background-color:#E9E9E9;"|
|- style="font-weight:bold"
| colspan="4" |Source:
|
|}

2003

|-
! colspan=2 style="background-color:#E9E9E9;text-align:left;vertical-align:top;" |Candidate
! style="background-color:#E9E9E9;text-align:left;vertical-align:top;" |Party
! style="background-color:#E9E9E9;text-align:right;" |Votes
! style="background-color:#E9E9E9;text-align:right;" |%
|-
|style="background-color:"|
|align=left|Aleksandr Belousov (incumbent)
|align=left|People's Party
|
|32.37%
|-
|style="background-color:"|
|align=left|Sergey Orlov
|align=left|Communist Party
|
|13.61%
|-
|style="background-color:"|
|align=left|Irina Skupova
|align=left|Yabloko
|
|10.49%
|-
|style="background-color:"|
|align=left|Mikhail Matveyev
|align=left|Independent
|
|6.72%
|-
|style="background-color:"|
|align=left|Vladimir Sherstnev
|align=left|Rodina
|
|6.15%
|-
|style="background-color:"|
|align=left|Vladislav Loskutov
|align=left|Independent
|
|4.36%
|-
|style="background-color:"|
|align=left|Pyotr Yershov
|align=left|Liberal Democratic Party
|
|4.31%
|-
|style="background-color:#00A1FF"|
|align=left|Aleksandr Martynov
|align=left|Party of Russia's Rebirth-Russian Party of Life
|
|1.85%
|-
|style="background-color:"|
|align=left|Anatoly Morozenko
|align=left|Independent
|
|0.69%
|-
|style="background-color:"|
|align=left|Yevgeny Yezhov
|align=left|Independent
|
|0.65%
|-
|style="background-color:#164C8C"|
|align=left|Nikolay Prokhodtsev
|align=left|United Russian Party Rus'
|
|0.55%
|-
|style="background-color:#7C73CC"|
|align=left|Nikolay Pereyaslov
|align=left|Great Russia–Eurasian Union
|
|0.47%
|-
|style="background-color:#000000"|
|colspan=2 |against all
|
|16.35%
|-
| colspan="5" style="background-color:#E9E9E9;"|
|- style="font-weight:bold"
| colspan="3" style="text-align:left;" | Total
| 
| 100%
|-
| colspan="5" style="background-color:#E9E9E9;"|
|- style="font-weight:bold"
| colspan="4" |Source:
|
|}

2016

|-
! colspan=2 style="background-color:#E9E9E9;text-align:left;vertical-align:top;" |Candidate
! style="background-color:#E9E9E9;text-align:left;vertical-align:top;" |Party
! style="background-color:#E9E9E9;text-align:right;" |Votes
! style="background-color:#E9E9E9;text-align:right;" |%
|-
|style="background-color:"|
|align=left|Nadezhda Kolesnikova
|align=left|United Russia
|
|45.03%
|-
|style="background-color:"|
|align=left|Mikhail Matveyev
|align=left|Communist Party
|
|20.57%
|-
|style="background-color:"|
|align=left|Oksana Lantsova
|align=left|Liberal Democratic Party
|
|9.92%
|-
|style="background:"| 
|align=left|Vadim Baykov
|align=left|Communists of Russia
|
|4.85%
|-
|style="background:"| 
|align=left|Pyotr Zolotarev
|align=left|A Just Russia
|
|4.70%
|-
|style="background:"| 
|align=left|Sergey Sovetkin
|align=left|Yabloko
|
|2.52%
|-
|style="background:"| 
|align=left|Yekaterina Gerasimova
|align=left|People's Freedom Party
|
|2.40%
|-
|style="background:"| 
|align=left|Pyotr Vasilyev
|align=left|Party of Growth
|
|1.85%
|-
|style="background: "| 
|align=left|Vladimir Dovbysh
|align=left|The Greens
|
|1.68%
|-
|style="background:"| 
|align=left|Oleg Sabantsev
|align=left|Patriots of Russia
|
|1.09%
|-
|style="background:"| 
|align=left|Aleksey Ofitserov
|align=left|Civic Platform
|
|1.07%
|-
| colspan="5" style="background-color:#E9E9E9;"|
|- style="font-weight:bold"
| colspan="3" style="text-align:left;" | Total
| 
| 100%
|-
| colspan="5" style="background-color:#E9E9E9;"|
|- style="font-weight:bold"
| colspan="4" |Source:
|
|}

2018

|-
! colspan=2 style="background-color:#E9E9E9;text-align:left;vertical-align:top;" |Candidate
! style="background-color:#E9E9E9;text-align:left;vertical-align:top;" |Party
! style="background-color:#E9E9E9;text-align:right;" |Votes
! style="background-color:#E9E9E9;text-align:right;" |%
|-
| style="background-color: " |
|align=left|Aleksandr Khinshtein
|align=left|United Russia
|117,726
|56.98%
|-
| style="background-color: " |
|align=left|Mikhail Abdalkin
|align=left|Communist Party
|29,868
|14.46%
|-
| style="background-color: " |
|align=left|Vadim Baykov
|align=left|Communists of Russia
|15,288
|7.40%
|-
| style="background-color: " |
|align=left|Roman Sinelnikov
|align=left|Liberal Democratic Party
|13,318
|6.45%
|-
| style="background-color: " |
|align=left|Aleksandr Gusev
|align=left|A Just Russia
|12,478
|6.04%
|-
| style="background-color: " |
|align=left|Igor Yermolenko
|align=left|Yabloko
|6,758
|3.27%
|-
| colspan="5" style="background-color:#E9E9E9;" |
|- style="font-weight:bold"
| colspan="3" style="text-align:left;" |Total
|206,602
|100%
|-
| colspan="5" style="background-color:#E9E9E9;" |
|- style="font-weight:bold"
| colspan="4" |Source:
|
|}

2021

|-
! colspan=2 style="background-color:#E9E9E9;text-align:left;vertical-align:top;" |Candidate
! style="background-color:#E9E9E9;text-align:left;vertical-align:top;" |Party
! style="background-color:#E9E9E9;text-align:right;" |Votes
! style="background-color:#E9E9E9;text-align:right;" |%
|-
|style="background-color: " |
|align=left|Aleksandr Khinshtein (incumbent)
|align=left|United Russia
|115,721
|51.12%
|-
|style="background-color: " |
|align=left|Mikhail Abdalkin
|align=left|Communist Party
|47,695
|21.07%
|-
|style="background-color: " |
|align=left|Aleksey Mitrofanov
|align=left|A Just Russia — For Truth
|12,989
|5.74%
|-
| style="background-color: " |
|align=left|Maria Bolshakova
|align=left|Communists of Russia
|11,338
|5.01%
|-
|style="background-color: " |
|align=left|Aleksey Neudakhin
|align=left|New People
|10,894
|4.81%
|-
|style="background-color: " |
|align=left|Andrey Sedogin
|align=left|Liberal Democratic Party
|9,646
|4.26%
|-
|style="background-color: " |
|align=left|Yevgeny Lartsev
|align=left|Party of Freedom and Justice
|5,713
|2.52%
|-
|style="background-color: " |
|align=left|Aleksandr Shatilov
|align=left|Yabloko
|4,277
|1.89%
|-
| colspan="5" style="background-color:#E9E9E9;"|
|- style="font-weight:bold"
| colspan="3" style="text-align:left;" | Total
| 226,365
| 100%
|-
| colspan="5" style="background-color:#E9E9E9;"|
|- style="font-weight:bold"
| colspan="4" |Source:
|
|}

Notes

References 

Politics of Samara Oblast
Russian legislative constituencies
Constituencies established in 1993